"Top of the World" is a song by New Zealand indie pop singer Kimbra. It was released on 10 November 2017 as the second single from her third studio album Primal Heart (2018). A remix of the song featuring American rapper Snoop Dogg was released 20 July 2018.

Music video

The official music video for "Top of the World" was directed by Guy Franklin.

Chart positions

References

External links
 
 

2017 songs
2017 singles
Kimbra songs
Snoop Dogg songs
Song recordings produced by Kimbra
Song recordings produced by John Congleton
Song recordings produced by Skrillex
Songs written by Kimbra
Songs written by Lars Horntveth
Songs written by Skrillex
Warner Records singles